Michael Bruno is a entrepreneur with a specialty in developing digital technology for the design industry.  He is the founder of 1stdibs, an online marketplace for luxury antiques, furniture, jewelry, and fine art from thousands of dealers worldwide. He is also the founder of the home design app Housepad, Tuxedo Hudson Company and Tuxedo Hudson Realty, and Art-Design-Carta. As a collector of historic homes and a dedicated land preservationist, Bruno is currently redeveloping the commercial passageway of the historic 17 Corridor between Sloatsburg and Tuxedo all in New York, with his vision of creating access to the Hudson Valley.

Early life

Michael Bruno was the fourth of six children.  He was born and raised in Larchmont, New York.  He is a former competitive swimmer and Junior Olympics winner.
 
Bruno studied business at San Diego State University and later moved to San Francisco, California, where he worked as a real estate broker.

Business ventures

During the dot-com boom of the 1990s  Bruno worked as a real estate agent for Sotheby's real-estate division in San Francisco.  Bruno says he was inspired to get his real estate license at age 19 after reading Napoleon Hill's 1937 self-improvement book "Think and Grow Rich".
 
In 2001, after moving to Paris, France, Bruno created 1stdibs.com, an online luxury marketplace for antiques, jewelry, and fine art that grew to include thousands of dealers around the world. He said the idea for the company came to him while visiting the famous Clignancourt flea market in Paris.
 
Since the company's founding, it has expanded into 17 markets around the world, including the United States, several European countries, and Australia.
 
In 2011, Bruno accepted a $60 million investment from venture capital firm, Benchmark, and stepped down from his role as CEO of 1stdibs but stayed on as chief creative officer.  In late 2012, 1stdibs received an additional $42 million in Series B funding from Index Ventures and Spark Capital.
 
In January 2014, Chinese ecommerce company Alibaba Group invested $15 million in 1stdibs to help the company expand its business in Asia.
 
In 2015 Bruno launched an interior design app called HousePad.  Housepad is a digital household management and communication tool that helps homeowners communicate with family members, guests, and home-related service providers such as interior designers, architects, and gardeners.

In 2016, Art-Design-Carta was launched. Art-Design-Carta is a private marketplace that is available to professionals in the art and design business. The site allows dealers to offer their latest finds to professional buyers before they post them on any open market sites.

Real estate and historic building preservation

Bruno is a collector of historic properties and has been purchasing and restoring historic homes and properties since the 1990s.  He says his passion for historic preservation began with the purchase of a 1920s-era villa designed by William Templeton Johnson.

In 2012, Bruno bought a 12,000-square-foot mansion in Tuxedo Park, New York. The mansion was designed in the early 1900s by John Russell Pope.  Bruno also owns a historic park adjacent to the Tuxedo Park property.  The 55-acre park was designed by Frederick Law Olmsted, the landscape architect who designed Central Park in New York City.  The Tuxedo Park home was featured in a July 2015 photo tour in design magazine Elle Décor.

Bruno owns several additional historic properties in and around Tuxedo Park, including Loomis Laboratory, a stone castle built in 1901.  The Loomis Laboratory building serves as headquarters for Bruno's Housepad app.

Bruno and his partner Alexander Jakowec purchased a 14,000 square-foot mansion on Coopers Neck Lane in Southampton, New York in 2015. The mansion was built in the early 20th century by American architect and urban planner Grosvenor Atterbury.

Revitalization of the towns of Tuxedo and Sloatsburg, New York

As of early 2016, Bruno owns $15 million worth of property in Tuxedo, New York. Bruno plans to revitalize the town with an emphasis on New Urbanist principles, and in January 2016 he stated that his future projects and business endeavors in the area would include a farmers' market, a restaurant, an inn, and an antiques store.

In August 2016, Bruno offered a first glimpse into his vision for the area with the opening of Blue Barn, a new organic farmstand in Sloatsburg. It follows his "Hudson Valley first" focus, which is all about harvesting locally sourced produce from the Hudson Valley.

In 2016, Bruno started Tuxedo Hudson Realty, a commercial and residential real estate company focused on the town of Tuxedo.

Awards and publicity

Bruno appeared on The Martha Stewart Show in February 2010 to discuss 1stdibs.

In May 2012, New York-based charity organization Lighthouse International honored Bruno and fashion designer Carolina Herrera for being "fashion visionaries."

Bruno was a recipient of the 2012 "Innovators" award from the Sir John Sloane Museum Foundation.

In October 2014, Bruno was the recipient of design and decorating magazine Traditional Home's first-ever Trailblazer Award.

In 2015, The Decorators Club celebrated their 100th anniversary.  Bruno was honored as the evening's benefactor.

In 2017, Bruno was appointed to the Board of Directors of the Orange County Land Trust.

Personal life

Bruno lives with his partner Alexander Jakowec, a former antiques dealer. They have two English cream golden retrievers, Natasha and Boris.

References

Living people
Businesspeople from New York (state)
American interior designers
LGBT people from New York (state)
American technology company founders
American computer businesspeople
People from Tuxedo, New York
American Internet company founders
American real estate businesspeople
Year of birth missing (living people)